The Blood Spilt (2004) is a crime novel by Swedish writer Åsa Larsson, second in the Rebecka Martinsson series. It was published in the US in January 2007, and will be published in the UK in 2008. It received the Best Swedish Crime Novel Award of 2004.

References

2004 Swedish novels
Novels by Åsa Larsson
Rebecka Martinsson books
Swedish crime novels